Starbucks Israel was a coffee chain in Israel, opening in 2001, with six locations in Tel Aviv before closing in 2003.

History

Opening 
Starbucks Coffee International, a subsidiary of Starbucks Coffee Company, partnered with Delek Group of Israel to form the Israeli subsidiary of Starbucks, under the joint venture known is Shalom Coffee Company. The joint venture, formed in 2001, was owned 19.5% by Starbucks and 80.5% by Delek, with Starbucks holding the option to increase their share to 50%.

Delek paid $250,000 for the franchise rights, plus owed 6% of sales to Starbucks.

Plans were for September 1, 2001 to have the first location open in Tel Aviv's Rabin Square. Starbucks had hoped to have 20 locations open in Israel within the first year.

Closing 
In 2002, within a year of Starbucks Israel opening, Delek was already looking to sell its stake.

Before its closing, Starbucks had six locations in Tel Aviv, with 120 employees. Additionally they had previously planned on opening a location in Jerusalem but withdrew the plans due to fear of terror attacks. On March 31, 2003, Starbucks announced that they would be closing their stores in Israel.

Starbucks closing caused many controversies over rumors that the stores were closing due to political reasons. Many rumors began circulating on the internet that they were closing as part of an Arab boycott of American businesses in Israel. Based on information put out by Starbucks, no information pointed towards caving into anti-Israel pressure. Bill O’Shea, Starbucks VP of Business Development in Europe, Middle East and Africa, released a letter stating that Starbucks chose to close their Israel locations due to business reasons, not political.

Reemergence attempt 
In September 2005 Starbucks hired MAN Properties Real Estate Consultants to explore options to return to Israel. Starbucks was looking for a managing partner to team up with in Israel for the renewed deployment strategy.

See also

Culture of Israel
Israeli cuisine
Economy of Israel
 List of restaurants in Israel

References 

Starbucks
Defunct restaurant chains in Israel
Restaurants established in 2001
Restaurants disestablished in 2003
Coffeehouses and cafés in Israel
2003 disestablishments in Israel
Israeli companies established in 2001